Shidvar Island, is an uninhabited island in the Persian Gulf east of the larger inhabited island of Lavan. The whole island is a natural reserve called Shidvar Wildlife Refuge. Administratively, the island forms part of the Lavan Rural District in Kish District, Bandar Lengeh County, Hormozgan Province, Iran.

The name Shetor or Shotor in Persian means Camel.

The island was designated a Ramsar site in 1999.

See also
List of islands of Iran

References 

Ramsar sites in Iran
Bandar Lengeh County
Landforms of Hormozgan Province
Uninhabited islands of Iran